Brahin District or Brahinski Rajon (Bragin District), is a district of Gomel Region, in Belarus. Its administrative seat is the small town of Brahin.

Geography
The district includes the towns of Brahin and Kamaryn, 14 rural councils (Selsovets), and several villages. Following the 1986 Chernobyl disaster, it is partially included in the Polesie State Radioecological Reserve. To the south of Kamaryn is situated the southernmost point of Belarus.

Notable residents 

Julija Cimafiejeva (b. 1982, Śpiaryžža village), Belarusian poet and translator

See also
Brahin (meteorite)
Chernihiv–Ovruch railway
Chernobyl Nuclear Power Plant

References

External links

 
Districts of Gomel Region
Polesie State Radioecological Reserve